

Afghanistan
ANA Special Operations Command
National Mission Brigade (NMB)
1st Ktah Khas Battalion (aka: Afghan Partner Unit (APU))
6th Special Operations Kandak (SOK)
Special Missions Wing
Military Intelligence Battalion
National Strategic Reserve Operations Battalion
Afghan National Army Commando Corps
1st SO Brigade at Gardez

Australia
No. 200 Flight RAAF
Australian Army Training Team Vietnam (AATTV)
Australian commandos
Combined Field Intelligence Service
Far Eastern Liaison Office (FELO)
M Special Unit
Rose Force
Royal Australian Navy Beach Commandos
Services Reconnaissance Department
Z Special Unit
Bushveldt Carbineers

Austro-Hungarian Empire 
 Jagdkommando

Canada
1st Special Service Force
Special Air Service Company

Croatia
Zrinski Battalion
Frankopan Battalion

Ethiopia
103rd Commando Division - Derg government, active 1988-89

Empire of Japan
 Empire of Japan
Japanese Special Attack Units
Kamikaze ("divine wind")
Imperial Japanese Army Air Service
Teishin Shudan ("Raiding Group")
Giretsu ("Heroic Paratroopers")
Imperial Japanese Navy Air Service
1st Yokosuka SNLF
2nd Yokosuka SNLF
3rd Yokosuka SNLF
Imperial Japanese Army Air Force
1st Raiding Group
2nd Raiding Group

Germany
 German Empire
 Sturmtruppen (17 battalions)

 Nazi Germany
Abwehr- units later reassigned to Wehrmacht after expanding to divisional size
Brandenburg Lehr und Bau Battalion zbV 800 – December 1939
 1. Company - Baltic/ Russian
 2. Company - English/ North and South Africa
 3. Company - Sudeten German/ Balkans
 4. Company - Volkdeutshe/ Eastern ethnic German
 Motorcycle platoon
 Parachute platoon
Brandenburg Lehr-Regiment zbV 800 – 1941–1943
 1st Battalion, at Brandenburg
 2nd Battalion at Baden
 3rd Battalion at Baden
 Intelligence Battalion
 Coastal Raiding Company
 Sonderverbrand 287 - Arab volunteers with brandenburg volunteer core 
 Sonderverbrand 288 - All German

Wehrmacht from 1943- 1945
HQ staff at Brandenburg an der Havel, Brandenburg
Verband 801, based in Brandenburg an der Havel
 I. Battalion
 II. Battalion
 III. Battalion
Verband 802 (Mountain), base in Admont, Steiermark
 I. Gebirgsjäger Battalion
 II. Gebirgsjäger Battalion
 III. Gebirgsjäger Battalion
Verband 803, based in Düren, North Rhine-Westphalia
 I. Battalion 
 II. Battalion
 III. Battalion
 13. Legionärs Company
Verband 804 (Legionärs), based in Langenargen, Bodensee 
 I. Legionärs Battalion
 II. Legionärs Battalion
 III. Legionärs Bataillon
Verband 805, based in Brandenburg an der Havel
Intelligence Detachment 800
 5X Company
Intelligence Support Detachment 800
 4X Company
Coastal Rangers Detachment 800, based at Langenargen, Bodensee
 4X Company (1, 2, 3 and 4)
Signals Detachment 800
 3X Company (1, 2 and 3)
Training Unit, Gut „Quenzsee“ (or „Quenzgut“), based near Brandenburg

Kriegsmarine
Marinestosstruppkompanie
Lehrkommandos 200, 250, 300, 350, and 700

Luftwaffe
Fallschirmjäger
Kampfgeschwader 200
Jagdverband 44

Waffen-SS
Sonderlehrgang z.b.V. „Oranienburg“ (18 April 1943 – 16 June 1943)
Sonderverband z. b. V. "Friedenthal" (16 June 1943 – 17 April 1944)
502nd SS Jäger Battalion (17 April 1944 – 10 November 1944) 
500th SS Jäger Battalion
600th SS Jäger Battalion
SS-Jagdverband
SS-Jagdverband Mitte
150th SS Panzer Brigade (November 1944 - 25–28 December 1944)
Division Schwedt Kampfgruppe/Sperrverband Skorzeny (31 January 1945 – 3 March 1945)
SS-Jagdverband Nordwest
SS-Jagdverband Ost
SS-Jagdverband Südost
SS-Jagdverband Südwest

 German Democratic Republic
 Diensteinheit IX
 Fallschirmjägerbataillon 40 "Willi Sänger"
 Luftsturmregiment 40 "Willi Sänger"

 Germany
 Kommandokompanien B1 (Kommando)

Greece
 Sacred Band
 3rd Special Forces Division (Greece)

Fiji
Counter Revolutionary Warfare Unit (1987-2000)

Indonesia
Kopkamtib (1965-1988)
Bakorstanas (1988-2000)

Ireland
Free State Army Intelligence Department

Israel
Palmach
Unit 101
Samson Unit
Force 100
Sayeret Haruv
TAT'ZAM
Sayeret Shaked
Sayeret Rimon

Kingdom of Italy
World War I
 Arditi
World War II
Regio Esercito : 10th Arditi Regiment (3 battalions, plus 1 combined parachutist battalion)
Regia Marina : Decima Flottiglia MAS
Regia Aeronautica : A.D.R.A. Arditi Distruttori Regia Aeronautica (2 battalions)
Blackshirts

Netherlands
Korps Speciale Troepen

Poland
 Second Polish Republic
Wawelberg Group
 Polish government-in-exile
Cichociemni
 Independent Grenadiers Company
 Polish Underground State
Battalion Parasol
 Polish People's Republic
 1st Assault Battalion

Portugal

Caçadores Especiais
Flechas
Grupos Especiais

Philippine Republic
Philippine Revolutionary Army
Luna Sharpshooters

Rhodesia
Selous Scouts
Rhodesian Special Air Service
Grey's Scouts

Serbia

 Counter-Terrorist Unit (PTJ), MUP, merged into Special Anti-Terrorist Unit (SAJ)
 Special Operations Unit (JSO), SDB, disbanded

South Africa
South African Special Forces
1 Reconnaissance Commando
 2 Reconnaissance Commando (Citizen Force)
 3 Reconnaissance Commando (consisting of former Selous Scouts)
 6 Reconnaissance Commando (consisting of former Rhodesian SAS)
 31 Battalion "the Bushman Battalion" Originally "Alpha Group"
 31 Battalion Recce Wing
32 Battalion 'The Terrible Ones' Originally "Bravo Group"
 32 Battalion Recce Wing
Civil Cooperation Bureau (CCB)
 Hunter Group
Koevoet
44 Parachute Brigade Pathfinder Company 'The Philistines'

Syria
 Defense companies
 Struggle Companies

Turkey
 Special Warfare Department

United Kingdom
British Army
Army Commandos (1940 - 1946)
 No. 1 Commando
 No. 2 Commando
 No. 3 Commando
 No. 4 Commando
 No. 5 Commando
 No. 6 Commando
 No. 7 Commando
 No. 8 (Guards) Commando
 No. 9 Commando
 No. 10 (Inter-Allied) Commando
 No. 11 (Scottish) Commando
 No. 12 Commando
 No. 14 (Arctic) Commando
 No. 30 Commando
 No. 50 Commando
 No. 51 Commando
 No. 52 Commando
 No. 62 Commando
 Middle East Commando
Long Range Penetration Group “The Chindits”
Ferret Force
Phantom
Layforce
Long Range Desert Group (LRDG)
Popski's Private Army (PPA)
 Raiding Support Regiment (RSR)
 Special Interrogation Group (SIG)
T-Force
V-Force
Z Force

Royal Air Force
Royal Air Force Commandos

Royal Marines
 Royal Marine Detachment 385 (Small Operations Group)
 Sea Reconnaissance Unit (SRU)
 Royal Marine Demolition Unit

Royal Navy
Royal Navy Commandos - 22 units each consisting of 10 officers and 65 ratings

Combined Operations
30 Assault Unit
Combined Operations Pilotage Parties
Royal Marine Boom Patrol Detachment (RMBPD) The “Cockleshell Heroes”

Directorate of Military Intelligence
Special Operations Executive
 Force 133
Force 136
 Force 137
 Force 266
 Force 399
Norwegian Independent Company 1
Small Scale Raiding Force (SSRF) "62 Commando"

Other
 UK and the Royal Navy Volunteer Group (Korean War unit)
 Special Reconnaissance Unit 
 14 Intelligence Company "The Det"
 The Increment

United States

The Civil War
 Jessie Scouts
 Mosby's Rangers
 Quantrill's Raiders

World War II
 1st Air Commando Group
 1st Special Service Force "Devil's Brigade"
 2nd Air Commando Group
 3rd Air Commando Group
 6th Army Special Reconnaissance Unit "Alamo Scouts"
 Alaskan Scouts
 Army Ranger Battalions
 5307th Composite Unit (provisional) "Merrill's Marauders"
 Marine Raiders
1st and 2nd Raider Regiment
1st, 2nd, 3rd and 4th Raider Battalions
 Observer Group
 Sino-American Cooperative Organization
 Naval Group, China (NGC)
 Naval Scouts and Raiders
 Navy Combat Demolition Units (NCDU)
 US Navy Beach Jumpers
 Office of Strategic Services (OSS)
 2641st Special Group
 2671st Special Reconnaissance Battalion
 2677th Office of Strategic Services Regiment
 US Army Air Forces Carpetbaggers
 OSS Detachment 101
 OSS Detachment 202
 OSS Detachment 303
 OSS Detachment 404
 OSS Detachment 505
 OSS Jedburgh Teams
 OSS Operational Groups (OG)
 OSS Maritime Unit (MU)
 OSS Maritime Unit, Operational Swimmer Group
 OSS Weather Observers 
 Special Allied Airborne Reconnaissance Force (SAARF)

Korean War
 Air Resupply And Communications Service (ARCS)
580th Air Resupply and Communications Wing (580th ARCS)
581st Air Resupply and Communications Wing (581st ARCS)
582nd Air Resupply and Communications Wing
 Airborne Ranger Companies
 Combined Command Reconnaissance Activities, Korea (CCRAK)
 6167th Air Base Group
6167th Operations Squadron 
B Flight, 6167th ABG
 Detachment 1, 6160th ABG/22nd Crash Boat Rescue Squadron (CBRS), Korea Detachment
 Joint Advisory Commission, Korea (JACK)
 Special Activities Group (SAG)
 GHQ 1st Raider Company (Provisional)/8227th Army Unit
 Unit 4 21st Troop Carrier Squadron (TCS), 5th AF/Special Air Missions (SAM) Detachment, 21st Troop Carrier Squadron (TCS), 5th AF
 United Nations Partisan Infantry Korea (UNPIK)
 BAKER Section
 Partisan Airborne Infantry Regiment (PAIR)
 US Navy Special Operations Group, Korea

Vietnam War
 46th Special Forces Company
 Long Range Reconnaissance Patrol (LRRP)
 MIKE Force
 Military Assistance Command, Vietnam Studies and Observations Group(MACV-SOG)
 Phoenix Program
Project 404/Palace Dog
 Project "Leaping Lena" (Vietnam War)
 Project DELTA
 Project GAMMA
 Project Sigma and Project Omega
 Raven Forward Air Controllers
 Tiger Force
 US Navy Boat Support Units (BSU)

Other
 1st Battalion, 245th Special Operations Aviation Regiment (Airborne)
 5th Force Reconnaissance Company
 6th Special Forces Group
 8th Special Forces Group
 11th Special Forces Group
 12th Special Forces Group
 55th Special Operations Squadron
 129th Air Commando Group
 129th Special Operations Aviation Company (SOAC)
 437th Combat Control Squadron 
 617th Special Operations Aviation Detachment 
 745th Special Operations Squadron
 1730th Pararescue Squadron
 Army Aviation Support Element (AASE), US Special Operations Command
 Blue Light
 Detachment A (DET A, 39th SFOD)
 HAL-3 "Sea Wolves"
 HAL-4 "Red Wolves"
 HAL-5 "Blue Hawks"
 Marine Corps Special Operations Command Detachment One (MCSOCOM-Det 1) (Operation Iraqi Freedom)
 Red Cell
 SEASPRAY
 Special Forces Groups Aviation Detachments
 Special Warfare Aviation Detachments (SWAD)
 22d Aviation Detachment (Special Forces)
 23d SWAD (Surveillance)
 281st Aviation Company (Assault Helicopter)(Airmobile Light)
 Special Boat Unit 11 (SBU 11)
 Special Boat Unit 13 (SBU 13)
 Special Boat Unit 24 (SBU 24)
 Special Boat Unit 26 (SBU 26)
 Special Operations Reconnaissance 
 Task Force 5 (forerunner of Task Force 11)
 Task Force 11 (Operation Enduring Freedom)
 Task Force 20 and Task Force 121 (Operation Iraqi Freedom)
 Task Force 98
 Task Force 157 (Covert USN Intelligence unit)
 Task Force Bayonet (Operation Just Cause)
 Task Force Ranger (Operation Gothic Serpent)
 Underwater Demolitions Teams (UDT)
 US Air Force Special Operations Weather Teams (SOWT)
 US Army Special Operations Agency
 US Army Special Operations Division
 USAF Special Operations Combat Control Team (SOCCT)
 US Coast Guard Drug Interdiction Assist Team (DIAT)
 Yellow Fruit
 Naval Interdiction Forces ((Rose Units))

Republic of Vietnam
South Vietnamese Rangers At its peak there were 22 ARVN Ranger Battalions organized in 10 Groups.
1st Ranger Group - Da Nang (I Corps/CTZ)
2nd Ranger Group - Pleiku (II Corps/CTZ)
3rd Ranger Group - Biên Hòa (III Corps/CTZ)
4th Ranger Group - Chi Long (initially in the 44 Tactical Zone and later the IV Corps)
5th Ranger Group - Biên Hòa (III Corps/CTZ)
6th Ranger Group - Biên Hòa (III Corps/CTZ)
7th Ranger Group - Saigon, attached to Airborne Division
8th Ranger Group - Formed in 1974-75
9th Ranger Group - Formed in 1974-75
81st Ranger Group (Airborne) - Biên Hòa

Additionally, during the Vietnamization of the CIDG and MIKE Forces, former CIDG units were namely given Ranger status and organized into groups mostly of 3 battalions each, but they were largely local forces without any special forces capabilities.
21st Ranger Group
22nd Ranger Group
23rd Ranger Group
24th Ranger Group
25th Ranger Group
31st Ranger Group
32nd Ranger Group
33rd Ranger Group
41st Ranger Border Defense Group - Chi Long HQ
42nd Ranger Border Defense Group - Chi Long HQ

South Vietnamese Special Forces (LLDB), later reformed as South Vietnamese Special Mission Service
 Project DELTA
 Project SIGMA
 Project OMEGA
 Project GAMMA
 Project CHERRY

Frogmen Team (LDNN)

See also
 List of special forces units
 List of commando units
 List of paratrooper forces
 List of police tactical units

References

Special forces units and formations
 

Special forces units